Fruzsina Medgyesi (born 18 June 1999) is a Hungarian figure skater. She is the 2016 Skate Helena champion, the 2018 Hungarian national champion, and a two-time Hungarian national silver medalist.

On the junior level, she is the 2016 Youth Olympics team event bronze medalist, and the 2015 Santa Claus Cup champion.

Career

Early years 
Medgyesi began learning to skate in 2004. She made her first appearance on the junior international level in November 2013, at Skate Celje. Her senior international debut came at the Hellmut Seibt Memorial in February 2015.

2015–2016 season 
Medgyesi competed at her first ISU Junior Grand Prix (JGP) assignment in August 2015, in Slovakia, and at her first ISU Challenger Series event, the 2015 CS Mordovian Ornament, in October. Her first senior international medal, gold, came at Skate Helena in January 2016.

In February 2016, she placed 14th in her individual event at the 2016 Winter Youth Olympics in Hamar, Norway. A member of Team Discovery, she won the bronze medal in the team event.

2016–2017 season 
Medgyesi placed 8th at both of her JGP assignments, in Estonia and the Czech Republic. In March 2017, she competed at her first ISU Championships – the 2017 World Junior Championships in Taipei, Taiwan. Ranked 32nd in the short program, she did not advance to the free skate. During the summer, she relocated to Bergamo, Italy, where Franca Bianconi and Rosanna Murante became her coach.

2017–2018 season 
In December 2017, Medgyesi won the Hungarian national title ahead of defending champion Ivett Tóth. Both skaters were assigned to the 2018 European Championships in Moscow. She relocated to Budapest and Szabolcs Vidrai became her coach again.

Programs

Competitive highlights 
CS: Challenger Series; JGP: Junior Grand Prix

References

External links 
 

1999 births
Hungarian female single skaters
Living people
Figure skaters from Budapest
Figure skaters at the 2016 Winter Youth Olympics